The Théâtre Nanterre-Amandiers, also Théâtre des Amandiers, is a theatre in Nanterre and a known theatre outside of Paris. The present building opened in 1976. The company is a Centre dramatique national (National dramatic center), a national public theatre. Artistic directors included Patrice Chéreau and Catherine Tasca (1982), Jean-Pierre Vincent (1990) and Jean-Louis Martinelli (2002). The theatre runs a film studio and an acting school which is connected to theatre studies at the Paris West University Nanterre La Défense.

History 
The theatre developed from the Festival de Nanterre, first staged in 1965 in a circus tent. In 1966 it was moved to the University of Nanterre. From 1971 it was made a Centre dramatique national, a national public theater, and received public funding.

In 1976 the theatre moved to the Maison de la Culture. That event is considered the inauguration of the theater. The building, which seats 900 people, is at 7 avenue Pablo Picasso in Nanterre. In 1982 the theatre was named Théâtre des Amandiers and directed by Patrice Chéreau and Catherine Tasca. Chéreau established a theatre school and a film studio. His first staging was Combat de nègres et de chiens by Bernard-Marie Koltès, followed by the author's Quai Ouest, Dans la solitude des champs de coton and Le retour au désert. Productions of Arthur Schnitzler's Das weite Land by Luc Bondy and a staged version of Louis-Ferdinand Céline's novel Journey to the End of the Night by André Engel were also notable. Chéreau staged plays by Jean Genet, Pierre de Marivaux, Heiner Müller, Jean Racine, and Shakespeare.

Jean-Pierre Vincent directed the theatre from 1990 to 2001. From 1991 to 2001 Georges Aperghis, the leader of the group L'ATEM, directed music productions. From 2001 Jean-Louis Martinelli directed the theatre.

Directors 
 Maison de la Culture
 1969–1974  / Pierre Laville 
 1974–1978 Pierre Debauche
 1978–1982 Raoul Sangla
 Centre Dramatique National
 1974–1982 Xavier Pommeret
 1982–1990 Patrice Chéreau / Catherine Tasca 
 1990–2001 Jean-Pierre Vincent
 from 2002

Literature 
 Manfred Brauneck, Gérard Schneilin (editors): Theaterlexikon 1. Begriffe und Epochen, Bühnen und Ensembles. Rowohlt Taschenbuch Verlag Reinbek bei Hamburg, 5th edition, August 2007, .

References

External links 
  
 Théâtre Nanterre-Amandiers theatre-contemporain.net 
 Théâtre des Amandiers scope.lefigaro.fr 
 Théâtre des Amandiers Nanterre 

 

Theatres in France
Theatre companies in France
Buildings and structures in Hauts-de-Seine
1976 establishments in France